Soslan Tsirikhov (born 24 November 1984) is a Russian athlete specializing in the shot put. He represented Russia at the 2012 Summer Olympics failing to qualify for the final.

Competition record

References

1984 births
Living people
Russian male shot putters
Athletes (track and field) at the 2012 Summer Olympics
Olympic athletes of Russia
Universiade medalists in athletics (track and field)
Universiade gold medalists for Russia
Universiade silver medalists for Russia
Competitors at the 2009 Summer Universiade
Medalists at the 2011 Summer Universiade
21st-century Russian people